Homeyreh (also Romanized as Ḩomeyreh and Ḩamīreh) is a village in Kuh Hamayi Rural District, Rud Ab District, Sabzevar County, Razavi Khorasan Province, Iran. At the 2006 census, its population was 28, in 6 families.

References 

Populated places in Sabzevar County